"Can't Get You Out of My Head" is a song that was recorded by Australian singer Kylie Minogue for her eighth studio album, Fever (2001). Parlophone Records released the song as the album's lead single on 8 September 2001. "Can't Get You Out of My Head", which was written and produced by Cathy Dennis and Rob Davis, is a dance-pop, techno-pop and nu-disco song that is known for its "la la la" hook. Its lyrics are about obsession with a love interest. Music critics praised the song's production and Minogue's vocals and labelled it a highlight of Fever.

The song reached number one on charts in 40 countries worldwide. It peaked at number one on the UK Singles Chart for four weeks and was certified two-times platinum by the British Phonographic Industry (BPI). It also topped the Australian Singles Chart and received a three-times Platinum certification from the Australian Recording Industry Association. In the United States, the song peaked at number seven on the Billboard Hot 100 chart and became Minogue's first US top-ten single in 13 years. , the track has sold over five million copies worldwide.

Dawn Shadforth directed the music video for "Can't Get You Out of My Head", which features Minogue dancing against futuristic backdrops; the white jumpsuit she wore in the video became a fashion statement. Since the song's release, Minogue has included it on the set lists of various concert tours. "Can't Get You Out of My Head" appeared on several decade-end lists compiled by media such as Rolling Stone, The Guardian and NME. In 2012, Minogue re-recorded the song for her orchestral compilation album The Abbey Road Sessions.

Writing and release
In 2000, British singer-songwriter Cathy Dennis and English songwriter Rob Davis had been brought together by Universal Publishing to work on new music. The session for "Can't Get You Out of My Head" began with Davis generating a 125 bpm drum loop using the computer program Cubase. Dennis improvised with the line "I just can't get you out of my head", which later became the song's lyric. After three and a half hours, Davis and Dennis had recorded the demo for "Can't Get You Out of My Head" and the vocals were recorded the same day; the pair said the recording process was "very natural and fluid", and did not rely on heavy instrumentation.

Prior to pitching the song to Kylie Minogue, Davis and Dennis unsuccessfully offered it to S Club 7 and Sophie Ellis-Bextor. Davis then met with Minogue's A&R executive Jamie Nelson, who was impressed by the song's upbeat production and thought it would appeal to clubgoers. Nelson booked the song for Minogue to record. Although Davis thought the recording session would later be cancelled, Minogue wanted to record the song after hearing 20 seconds of the demo. The song was recorded at Davis's home studio in Surrey, England. The music, except the guitar part, was programmed using a Korg Triton workstation via a MIDI interface. Tim Orford was the mix engineer for the song. In a 2011 interview Dennis stated, "even though Kylie wasn't the first artist to be offered the song, I don't believe anyone else would have done the incredible job she did with it".

In 2001, Minogue embarked on the On a Night Like This tour to promote her seventh studio album Light Years (2000). She premiered "Can't Get You Out of My Head" on stage during the tour. It was later chosen as the lead single from Minogue's eighth studio album Fever and Parlophone Records released it on 8 September 2001 in Australia and on 17 September in the United Kingdom and other European countries. In the United States, Capitol Records issued a 12-inch vinyl single on 8 January 2002.

Composition and lyrical interpretation

"Can't Get You Out of My Head" is three minutes and 50 seconds long. In their book The New Rolling Stone Album Guide, Nathan Brackett and Christian David Hoard labelled it a neo-disco track. Justin Myers of the Official Charts Company characterized it as a dance-pop song, while Stereogums Tom Breinan described it as a techno-pop anthem. "Can't Get You Out of My Head" is written in the key of D minor.

The song, which does not follow the common verse–chorus structure, is composed of numerous fragmented sections. According to Davis, it "breaks a few rules as it starts with a chorus and in comes the 'la's'". Minogue chants a "la la la" hook that is often noted as the song's most appealing part by music critics. According to BBC Radio 2, the song's composition is "deceptively simple, but its veins run with the whole history of electronic music". The writer described the song's bassline as "pulsing" and influenced by the music of English rock band New Order and German electronic music band Kraftwerk.

"Can't Get You Out of My Head" is about an obsession with an unknown person, who according to The Guardian'''s Dorian Lansky could be "a partner, an evasive one-night stand or someone who doesn't know [the song's narrator] exists". Writing for the same newspaper, Everett True identified a "darker element" in the simple lyrics and said this sentiment is echoed in Minogue's restrained vocals. True also said while Minogue's earlier work presented an optimistic romantic future, "Can't Get You Out of My Head" focuses on an unhealthy and potentially destructive obsession. He noted in her earlier songs, Minogue played "the wide-eyed ingénue with alacrity" but that in this track, she is aware of the harmful nature of her infatuation, which True called a "desire that is wholly dependent on her own self-control".

In 2012, Minogue re-recorded "Can't Get You Out of My Head" for her orchestral compilation album The Abbey Road Sessions. The 2012 version of the song has an altered musical arrangement and uses a pizzicato playing technique in which the strings of a string instrument are continuously plucked.

Critical reception
Chris True of AllMusic picked "Can't Get You Out of My Head" as a highlight of Fever, saying it "pulses and grooves like no other she's recorded". Entertainment Weeklys Jim Farber said the song "fully lives up to its title" and compared it to the music of American singer Andrea True. PopMatters Jason Thompson described Minogue's vocals as a "sexual come on" and called the song "trim and funky". Dominique Leone of Pitchfork wrote that the song "exudes a catchiness that belies its inherent simplicity, so reassuring during an era when chart acts sound increasingly baroque and producers race to see who can ape electronic music trends first".

In 2012, The Guardian critic Everett True defined "Can't Get You Out of My Head" as "one of those rare moments in pop: sleek and chic and stylish and damnably danceable, but with a darker element hidden in plain sight". In a 2014 retrospective review, Billboards Jason Lipshutz praised Minogue's vocals and said they complement the production, and that; "her voice operates alongside it, finding renewed power in its drive". Olive Pometsey of GQ deemed it "the sound of the noughties", highlighting the synthesisers that create "a moment of pure pop perfection". Writing for the Herald Sun, Cameron Adams placed "Can't Get You Out of My Head" at the top of his list of Minogue's best songs and called it "a happy accident". Adams wrote, "if you could program a computer to formulate the perfect pop song, it would sound like this".

Reviewing The Abbey Road Sessions version of the song, Tim Sendra of AllMusic said the "most interesting reboot" on the album took place on "Can't Get You Out of My Head", saying the "insistent strings push the song along with tightly coiled electricity that is impossible to resist". Sal Cinquemani of Slant Magazine chose the song as one of the album's highlights, saying its arrangement makes up for the absence of dance beats and vocal production. The Independents Simon Price wrote while the original version of "Can't Get You Out of My Head" would be "impossible to improve on", the reworked version "turns it into a pizzicato thriller score". According to Jude Rogers of The Quietus, the song's orchestral treatment does not work well for its memorable electronic production.

In 2003, Q Magazine ranked "Can't Get You Out of My Head" at number 694 on their list of the 1001 Best Songs Ever. In 2011, Rolling Stone magazine placed it at number 45 on their 100 Best Songs of the 2000s list, noting Minogue "seduced the US with this mirror-ball classic". NME ranked the song at number 74 on their 100 Best Track of the Noughties list, saying it "encapsulated everything enviable in a well-crafted song" and that it is Minogue's best single. In 2012, Priya Elan of NME placed the song at number four on her The Greatest Pop Songs in History list. In 2012, The Guardian included the song on their list of The Best Number One Records in the United Kingdom, labelling it "sleek, Arctic-blue minimalism, like an emotionally thwarted retelling of Donna Summer's 'I Feel Love'". "Can't Get You Out of My Head" won the award for Best Single at the 2001 Top of the Pops Awards ceremony. At the 2002 ARIA Music Awards ceremony, it won the awards for Single of the Year and Highest Selling Single, and Minogue won the Outstanding Achievement Award. In 2002, it won a Dutch Edison Award for Single of the Year. At the inaugural Premios Oye! in 2002, the song received a nomination in the Song of the Year category.

Commercial performance
"Can't Get You Out of My Head" reached number one in 40 countries worldwide. In Australia, the song entered the singles chart at number one and remained there for four consecutive weeks. The Australian Recording Industry Association certified it three-times Platinum, for shipments of over 210,000 copies. In the United Kingdom, it faced competition from Victoria Beckham's single "Not Such an Innocent Girl" (2001). On the 29 September 2001 UK Singles Chart, "Can't Get You Out of My Head" debuted at number one with first-week sales of 306,000 copies. It spent four weeks at number one and remained for 25 weeks in the UK's top 40. It was certified two-times Platinum by the British Phonographic Industry. As of 2021, it has sold over 1.53 million copies, and by 2013 it was the country's 75th best-selling single of all time. In the United States, "Can't Get You Out of My Head" peaked at number seven on the Billboard Hot 100 chart and became Minogue's best-selling US single since "The Loco-Motion" (1987). The Recording Industry Association of America certified "Can't Get You Out of My Head" Gold for shipments of over 500,000 copies.

The song was also certified Gold in Belgium, and New Zealand, Platinum in Austria, France, Germany, Greece, the Netherlands, Norway, South Africa, Sweden, and Switzerland; and two-times Platinum in Italy. As of February 2018, it is Minogue's highest-selling single with worldwide sales of over five million copies.

Music video
Development and synopsis

British director Dawn Shadforth directed the music video for "Can't Get You Out of My Head", which includes dance routines that were choreographed by American choreographer Michael Rooney. Minogue's looks—her youthfulness, slim figure and proportionally large mouth–had attracted comments on her exotic image; the British tabloid newspaper News of the World suggested she might be an alien. Shadforth and music critic Paul Morley took the comments on Minogue's looks into consideration, commenting on her as a "creative, experimental artist" by placing her face close to the camera lens in the music video, distorting her face but retaining her glamour.

The video begins with Minogue driving a De Tomaso Mangusta sports car while singing the song. The next scene depicts a number of couples dressed in black and white costumes performing a dance routine; they are soon joined by Minogue, who has wavy light-brown hair and is wearing a white tracksuit. The setting changes to a room where Minogue, now with straight hair and crimson lipstick, and wearing a white jumpsuit with a neckline plunging down to her navel, is striking poses. The outfit was designed by London-based fashion designer Fee Doran under the label Mrs Jones. According to Minogue, the outfit was inspired by fashion designs worn by Jamaican singer and model, Grace Jones. Minogue then performs a synchronised dance routine with several backup dancers, who are wearing red-and-black suits reminiscent of Kraftwerk's Man Machine uniforms. As the video ends, Minogue—again with curly hair and wearing a lavender halter-neck dress with ribbon tile trim, performs a similar routine on top of a building at night.

Impact
At the 2002 MTV Video Music Awards ceremony, the music video was nominated for Best Dance Video; Rooney won the award for Best Choreography. The hooded white jumpsuit Minogue wore in the music video is often considered to be one of her most iconic looks, particularly because of its deep, plunging neckline. Minogue's stylist William Baker described the choice of the outfit, saying, "it was pure but kind of slutty at the same time". The outfit was put on display at Kylie: The Exhibition, which featured memorabilia and costumes from Minogue's career, which was held at the Victoria and Albert Museum in London, and at the similar Kylie: an exhibition at the Powerhouse Museum in Sydney. The jumpsuit was also included in Minogue's official fashion photography book Kylie / Fashion, which was released to celebrate her 25 years in music.

The music video served as an inspiration for Morley while writing his book Words and Music: The History of Pop in the Shape of a City. In it, Morley said he "turned the lonely drive [Minogue] made in the song's video towards a city ... into a fictional history of music". University lecturers Diane Railton and Paul Weston, in their 2005 essay "Naughty Girls and Red Blooded Women (Representations of Female Heterosexuality in Music Video)", contrasted the music video of "Can't Get You Out of My Head" with that of Beyoncé's 2003 single "Baby Boy"; while both videos focus on two singers performing seductive dance routines, Minogue is presented in a calculated manner and "is always provisional, restricted, and contingent", whereas Beyoncé displays a particular "primitive, feral, uncontrolled and uncontrollable" sexuality that is embodied in the black female body. Railton and Weston said the videos are representative of the depictions of white and black women in colonial times and pop culture, respectively.

Live performances

On 2 September 2001, Minogue performed "Can't Get You Out of My Head" at the BBC Radio 1 One Big Sunday show in Leicester, UK. She sang the song on 8 November 2001 at the MTV Europe Music Awards ceremony in Frankfurt. At the 2002 Brit Awards held on 20 February 2002, Minogue performed a mash-up version Stuart Crichton remixed of "Can't Get You Out of My Head" and New Order's song "Blue Monday" (1983). The performance was ranked at number 40 on The Guardian 2011 list of 50 Key Events in the History of Dance Music. The mashup was titled "Can't Get Blue Monday Out of My Head"; it was released as the B-side of "Love at First Sight" and was included on Minogue's remix album Boombox (2008). On 16 March 2002, Minogue performed "Can't Get You Out of My Head" along with "In Your Eyes", on the US television show Saturday Night Live. On 13 December 2002, Minogue performed the song alongside "Come into My World" on Good Morning America.

In 2001, "Can't Get You Out of My Head" was included on the set list of Minogue's "On a Night Like This tour and the encore segment of the KylieFever2002 tour, which promoted Fever. In 2003, Minogue performed "Can't Get You Out of My Head" at the one-night concert Money Can't Buy at the Hammersmith Apollo in London in support of her ninth studio album Body Language. In 2005, she performed the song on her Showgirl: The Greatest Hits tour and on her Showgirl: The Homecoming tour in 2006–2007. In 2008, she sang "Can't Get You Out of My Head" on the KylieX2008 tour. In 2009, Minogue performed the song on the For You, for Me tour, which was her first concert tour of North America.

A rock-oriented version of the song was performed during the Aphrodite: Les Folies Tour in 2011. The following year, Minogue promoted The Abbey Road Sessions by performing at the BBC Proms in the Park at Hyde Park, London. During the event, she sang the orchestral version of "Can't Get You Out of My Head". She performed the same version of the song on series nine of The X Factor in the United Kingdom on 8 December 2012. A "slower, darker version" of the song was included on Minogue's Kiss Me Once Tour (2014–2015) set list. She also included "Can't Get You Out of My Head" on the 2015 Royal Albert Hall performance as part of her A Kylie Christmas concert. An acoustic-guitar-driven version of the song was performed on the Golden Tour (2018–2019). In 2019, during her Glastonbury Festival set, Minogue was joined by English singer Chris Martin and they performed "Can't Get You Out of My Head" together.

Legacy
According to author Lee Barron, "Can't Get You Out of My Head" "further established Minogue's cultural and commercial relevance in the new millennium". He said the song "with its hypnotic 'la la la' refrain and the deceptively uncomplicated, catchily repetitive beats and synth-sound, marked yet another clearly defined image transformation from the camp-infused Light Years to an emphasis upon a cool, machine-like sexuality". Everett True of The Guardian wrote the song continued Kylie's transition from the girl-next-door to "flirtatious, sophisticated persona" that started with the release of "Spinning Around" in 2000. True said the success of "Can't Get You Out of My Head" was one of the motivating factors behind "manufactured" pop music gaining "new postmodern respectability" and marked a "clear shift in attitude towards pop music among the 'serious' rock critic fraternity".

Publications like The Guardian and Rolling Stone'' recognise "Can't Get You Out of My Head" as Minogue's signature song. In 2012, the UK agency PRS for Music, which collects royalties on behalf of songwriters and composers, named "Can't Get You Out of My Head" the most popular song of the decade because it received the most airplay and live covers in the 2000s decade.

Track listings

 French CD, UK cassette and US 7" single
 "Can't Get You Out of My Head" – 3:50
 "Boy" – 3:47
 European and Australian CD single 1
 "Can't Get You Out of My Head" – 3:50
 "Boy" – 3:47
 "Rendezvous at Sunset" – 3:23
 "Can't Get You Out of My Head" (Video) – 3:47
 European CD single 2
 "Can't Get You Out of My Head" – 3:50
 "Can't Get You Out of My Head" (K & M's Mindprint Mix) – 6:34
 "Can't Get You Out of My Head" (Plastika Mix) – 9:26
 Australian CD single 2
 "Can't Get You Out of My Head" – 3:50
 "Can't Get You Out of My Head" (K & M's Mindprint Mix) – 6:34
 "Can't Get You Out of My Head" (Plastika Mix) – 9:26
 "Can't Get You Out of My Head" (Superchumbo Todo Mamado Mix) – 8:32
 Spanish CD single (Remix)
 "Can't Get You Out of My Head" (K&M Remix) – 6:34
 "Can't Get You Out of My Head" (Nick Faber Remix) – 5:59
 "Can't Get You Out of My Head" (Superchumbo Todo Mamado Mix) – 8:32
 UK 7" single
 "Can't Get You Out of My Head" – 3:50
 "Can't Get Blue Monday Out of My Head" – 4:01
 European 12" single
 "Can't Get You Out of My Head" (Original) – 3:50
 "Can't Get You Out of My Head" (Plastika Mix) – 9:26
 "Can't Get You Out of My Head" (Deluxe's Dirty Dub) – 6:53
 "Can't Get You Out of My Head" (Superchumbo Leadhead Dub) – 7:00

 UK limited edition 12" single
 "Can't Get You Out of My Head" (Extended Version) – 5:57
 "Can't Get You Out of My Head" (Extended Instrumental) – 5:57
 UK 12" double single
 "Can't Get You Out of My Head" (Deluxe's Dirty Dub) – 6:53
 "Can't Get You Out of My Head" (Deluxe's Dirty Dub Instrumental) – 6:52
 "Can't Get You Out of My Head" (Plastika Mix) – 9:26
 "Can't Get You Out of My Head" (Superchumbo Todo Mamado Mix) – 8:35
 "Can't Get You Out of My Head" (K & M's Remix) – 6:35
 US 12" single
 "Can't Get You Out of My Head" (Original Mix) – 3:48
 "Can't Get You Out of My Head" (K & M's Remix) – 6:33
 "Can't Get You Out of My Head" (Nick Faber Remix) – 5:58
 "Can't Get You Out of My Head" (Superchumbo Todo Mamado Mix) – 8:31
 Digital download
 "Can't Get Blue Monday Out of My Head" (Live in Manchester) – 4:54
 "Can't Get You Out of My Head" (Extended Instrumental) – 6:00
 "Can't Get You Out of My Head" (Extended Mix) – 5:59
 "Can't Get You Out of My Head" (Nick Faber Remix) – 6:00
 "Can't Get You Out of My Head" (Radio Slave Remix Dub Re-Edit) – 5:01
 "Can't Get You Out of My Head" (Radio Slave Vocal Re-Edit) – 10:25
 "Can't Get You Out of My Head" (Superchumbo Leadhead Dub) – 7:05
 "Can't Get You Out of My Head" (Superchumbo Todo Mamado Mix) – 8:34
 "Can't Get You Out of My Head" (Superchumbo Voltapella Mix) – 1:58

 Digital download (Peggy Gou's Midnight Remix)
 "Can't Get You out of My Head" (Peggy Gou's Midnight Remix) – 4:31

Charts

Weekly charts

Year-end charts

Decade-end charts

Certifications and sales

See also

 List of number-one singles of 2001 (Australia)
 List of number-one hits of 2001 (Austria)
 Ultratop 50 number-one hits of 2001
 Ultratop 40 number-one hits of 2001
 List of number-one songs of the 2000s (Denmark)
 List of European number-one hits of 2001
 List of number-one singles of 2001 (France)
 List of number-one hits of 2001 (Germany)
 List of number-one singles of 2001 (Ireland)
 List of number-one hits of 2001 (Italy)
 List of Dutch Top 40 number-one singles of 2001
 List of number-one singles from the 2000s (New Zealand)
 List of number-one songs in Norway
 List of number-one singles of 2001 (Spain)
 List of number-one singles of the 2000s (Sweden)
 List of number-one singles of the 2000s (Switzerland)
 List of UK Singles Chart number ones of the 2000s
 List of number-one dance singles of 2002 (U.S.)

References

Further reading

External links
"Can't Get You Out of My Head" at Kylie's official website (Archived).

2001 singles
2001 songs
2002 singles
ARIA Award-winning songs
Canadian Singles Chart number-one singles
Dance-pop songs
European Hot 100 Singles number-one singles
Irish Singles Chart number-one singles
Kylie Minogue songs
Number-one singles in Australia
Number-one singles in Austria
Number-one singles in Denmark
Number-one singles in Germany
Number-one singles in Greece
Number-one singles in Hungary
Number-one singles in Italy
Number-one singles in New Zealand
Number-one singles in Norway
Number-one singles in Poland
Number-one singles in Romania
Number-one singles in Spain
Number-one singles in Scotland
Number-one singles in Sweden
Number-one singles in Switzerland
Parlophone singles
SNEP Top Singles number-one singles
Songs written by Cathy Dennis
Songs written by Rob Davis (musician)
UK Singles Chart number-one singles